

The IAR-811 was a Romanian trainer aircraft built in the late 1940s. It was the first aircraft designed and built in Romania following the end of the Second World War.

The IAR-811 was designed by a team of designers at the Sovromtractor tractor factory at Brașov (formerly the Industria Aeronautică Română aircraft works) in 1949. It was a single-engined low-wing monoplane of all wooden construction. Its crew sat side by side under an enclosed canopy, and the aircraft was powered by a single  Train 6T engine. The only example made its first flight on 12 May 1949. It was claimed to be very manoeuvrable, and have good handling, and it was reported that consideration was given to putting the type into production, but the engine was no longer in production. The aircraft was developed into the IAR-813, which used the available and more powerful ( Walter Minor 4 engine.

Specifications

References

 
 
 

1940s Romanian military trainer aircraft
811